Sleuth is a 1972 British-American mystery comedy thriller film directed by Joseph L. Mankiewicz and starring Laurence Olivier and Michael Caine. The screenplay by playwright Anthony Shaffer was based on his 1970 Tony Award-winning play. Both Olivier and Caine were nominated for Academy Awards for their performances. This was Mankiewicz's final film. Critics gave the film overwhelmingly positive reviews.

Plot
Andrew Wyke, a successful crime fiction author, lives in a large country manor house filled with elaborate games and automata. He invites his wife's lover, Milo Tindle, a London businessman, to his home to discuss the situation and would like Milo to take his wife off of his hands. To provide him the means to support her, Andrew suggests that Milo steal some jewelry from the house, with Andrew recouping his losses through an insurance claim. Milo agrees and Andrew leads him through an elaborate scheme to fake a robbery. At the conclusion, Andrew pulls a gun on Milo and reveals the bogus theft was merely a ruse to frame Milo as a burglar so he can kill him. Andrew then appears to fatally shoot Milo.

A few days later, Inspector Doppler arrives to investigate Milo's disappearance. Andrew purports to know nothing, but as the inspector collates incriminating clues, Andrew breaks down and explains the burglary hoax. He insists he only pretended to shoot Milo using a blank cartridge and that his rival left humiliated but alive and unharmed. After finding evidence supporting a murder, Doppler arrests Andrew. As Andrew is about to be taken to the station, Doppler reveals himself as the heavily disguised Milo, seeking revenge on Andrew.

The score is seemingly evened until Milo announces they will play another game involving a real murder. Milo says he fatally strangled Andrew's mistress, Téa, and has planted incriminating evidence throughout Andrew's house. The police will arrive soon. Andrew dismisses his claim, but phones Téa to be sure, only to learn from Téa's flatmate, Joyce, that Téa is dead. Following Milo's cryptic clues, Andrew frantically searches the house for the planted evidence. Andrew finds the last item just as Milo says the police are arriving. The disheveled Andrew pleads with Milo to stall them while he composes himself. Milo is heard talking to the officers, but there are actually no police. Milo then reveals that he faked Téa's death with Joyce and Téa's willing assistance, thus tricking Andrew a second time.

As Milo prepares to leave, he continues humiliating Andrew with information provided by Andrew's wife and mistress. Andrew threatens to shoot Milo. However, Milo says he anticipated this and really did call the police, who are on their way. If Andrew kills him, he will be caught red-handed. Andrew, pushed too far when Milo ridicules his literary detective, disbelieves Milo and shoots and mortally wounds him. The police arrive outside and a distraught and defeated Andrew locks himself inside the house. As Milo lies dying, he tells Andrew to tell the police that it was, "all just a bloody game"; he then presses the automata control box, leaving Andrew surrounded by his electronic toys as police attempt to enter.

Cast

 Laurence Olivier as Andrew Wyke
 Michael Caine as Milo Tindle
 Alec Cawthorne as Inspector Doppler
 John Matthews as Detective Sergeant Tarrant
 Eve Channing as Marguerite Wyke
 Teddy Martin as Police Constable Higgs

Production

Shaffer was initially reluctant to sell the film rights to the play, fearful it would undercut the success of the stage version. When he finally did relent, he hoped the film would retain the services of Anthony Quayle, who had essayed the role of Wyke in London and on Broadway. Alan Bates was Shaffer's pick for the part of Milo Tindle. In the end, director Mankiewicz opted for Olivier and Caine.

When they met, Caine asked Olivier how he should address him. Olivier told him that it should be as "Lord Olivier", and added that now that that was settled he could call him "Larry". According to Shaffer, Olivier stated that when filming began he looked upon Caine as an assistant, but that by the end of filming he regarded him as a full partner.

The likeness of actress Joanne Woodward was used for the painting of Marguerite Wyke.

The production team intended to reveal as little about the movie as possible so as to make the conclusion a complete surprise to the audience. For this reason there is a false cast list at the beginning of the film which lists fictional people playing roles that do not exist. They are Alec Cawthorne as Inspector Doppler, John Matthews as Detective Sergeant Tarrant, Eve Channing (named after the characters Eve Harrington and Margo Channing from Mankiewicz's 1950 film All About Eve) as Marguerite Wyke, and Teddy Martin as Police Constable Higgs. Vincent Canby's review for The New York Times also listed fictitious actress Karen Minfort-Jones as playing Andrew's mistress Teya.

Much of the story revolves around the theme of crime fiction, as written by John Dickson Carr (St John Lord Merridew = Sir Henry Merrivale), on whom Olivier's physical appearance is modelled, and Agatha Christie, whose photo is included on Wyke's wall, and how it relates to real-life criminal investigations. Class conflict is also raised between Wyke, who has the trappings of an English country gentleman, compared to Tindle, the son of an immigrant from a poor area of London.

Reception and legacy
On Rotten Tomatoes the film has an approval rating of 93% based on reviews from 27 critics.

The film was nominated for Academy Awards for Best Actor in a Leading Role (Michael Caine and Laurence Olivier), Best Director and Best Music, Original Dramatic Score. Olivier won the New York Film Critics award for Best Actor as a compromise selection after the voters became deadlocked in a choice between Marlon Brando and Al Pacino in The Godfather after Stacy Keach in Fat City won a plurality in initial voting and rules were changed requiring a majority. Shaffer received an Edgar Award for his screenplay.

The film was the second to have practically its entire cast (Caine and Olivier) nominated for Academy Awards after Who's Afraid of Virginia Woolf? in 1966 and the first where exactly all of the actors in the film were nominated. (Virginia Woolf featured uncredited bit parts by actors playing the roadhouse manager and waitress.) This feat has been repeated only by Give 'em Hell, Harry! (1975), in which James Whitmore is the sole credited actor.

Critics Roger Ebert, Janet Maslin, Gary Arnold of The Washington Post, and several film historians have all noted similarities between Sleuth and Caine's 1982 film Deathtrap. SCTV episode 121 featured Dave Thomas playing Michael Caine, arguing that the two films were different because the library appeared on different sides of the set.

Accolades

Deleted footage
While questioning Wyke, Doppler points out that the clown costume that Tindle was wearing when he was shot is missing, though the clown's mask is later found and put on the head of the plastic skeleton in the cellar. He is probably implying that Tindle was buried with it.

In the trailer for the film, there are the scenes with Doppler laying out the evidence against Wyke as shown in the movie. They include him pulling open the shower curtains in one of the bathrooms and exposing the clown's jacket, dripping wet and apparently with bloodstains on it. This scene was not included in the final film.

Preservation
The Academy Film Archive preserved Sleuth in 2012.

2007 film

In September 2006 Kenneth Branagh announced at the Venice Film Festival his new film of the play, with the screenplay by Nobel laureate Harold Pinter. Caine starred in this adaptation, this time in the role of Wyke, and Jude Law played Tindle as a struggling actor. Production was completed in March 2007 and the film was released in the UK on 23 November 2007. The remake did not use any of the dialogue in Shaffer's original script and was considered unsuccessful in comparison with the original.

See also
 List of American films of 1972
 "This Charming Man", 1983 hit single by The Smiths that quotes some film dialogue in the lyrics.

References

External links

 
 
 
 
 Sleuth – Photos
 

1972 films
British films based on plays
Films about writers
Films set in England
British mystery thriller films
American mystery thriller films
Films directed by Joseph L. Mankiewicz
Films scored by John Addison
Films set in country houses
Edgar Award-winning works
Films shot at Pinewood Studios
Films with screenplays by Anthony Shaffer
20th Century Fox films
Films about con artists
ABC Motion Pictures films
Two-handers
1970s mystery thriller films
1970s English-language films
1970s American films
1970s British films